Wrexham Bradley Raiders are a rugby league club based in Wrexham, Wales. They play in the North Wales Championship competition.

History
Wrexham Bradley Raiders were formed in 2011 after discussions between the Welsh Rugby League, local coaches and rugby league supporters. After discussions with Wrexham Council it was agreed that they would train at Bradley Cricket Pavilion.

Wrexham Bradley Raiders joined the newly formed North Wales Conference in 2012 finishing bottom.

See also

List of rugby league clubs in Britain

References

External links

2011 establishments in Wales
Rugby clubs established in 2011
Welsh rugby league teams
Sport in Wrexham